Ivan Borisovich Kurpishev (born 2 March 1969 in Kurgan) is a Russian powerlifter.

References 

1969 births
Living people
People from Kurgan, Kurgan Oblast
Russian powerlifters
Sportspeople from Kurgan Oblast